Atmautluak Airport  is a state-owned public-use airport located in Atmautluak, in the Bethel Census Area of the U.S. state of Alaska.

As per Federal Aviation Administration records, this airport had 2,613 passenger boardings (enplanements) in calendar year 2007, an increase of 29% from the 2,018 enplanements in 2006.

Facilities 
Atmautluak Airport has one runway designated 15/33 with a 3,000 by 75 ft (914 x 23 m) gravel surface. The runway was previously 2,000 by 30 ft until it was expanded by the state.

Airlines and destinations 

Prior to its bankruptcy and cessation of all operations, Ravn Alaska served the airport.

Statistics

References

External links 
 FAA Alaska airport diagram (GIF)

Airports in the Bethel Census Area, Alaska